Aadupuliyattam is a 2016 Indian Malayalam-language horror film directed by Kannan Thamarakkulam and written by Dinesh Palleth, starring Jayaram, Om Puri, Ramya Krishnan, Sheelu Abraham, Akshara Kishor, Saju Navodaya, Ramesh Pisharody and Sampath Raj in lead roles. The major filming locations are Palani and Thodupuzha. Film released on 20 May 2016.
The horror thriller film is dubbed in Tamil as Shenbaga Kottai and Telugu as Mathangi and Hindi as Mera Badla 2.
The film was a commercial success at the box office.

Plot
The film starts showing a prince falling in love with a woman named Chempakam. Later, the prince is defeated in a war and he escapes to a palace where Chempakam resides (Chempakakotai). Chempakam, tells the prince that he cannot be captured by anyone as long she is there because she has some special powers and then cuts her throat. From there on, whoever enters Chempakakotai area will be killed by a supernatural power. The king spent nights alone in the palace with Chempakam's spirit until his death.

The story then shifts to the lives of Sathyajith, his wife, and his daughter.
Satyajith is a wealthy businessman who is haunted by some visions. On his psychiatrist's advice, he meets a yogi.
The yogi tells him that the property, Chempakakottai, which he bought 2 years ago, is the reason for his visions and that some spirits are waiting to take revenge against him by killing his family and friends. He also says that soil taken from four corners of the kottai should be brought to him. Satyajith sends his friend to take the soil. Although his friend who does not believe in ghosts manages to get the soil, he is brutally beaten up and put in the ICU by a supernatural power.
Satyajith takes the soil to the yogi who puts it with some statues in three bags. He tells Satyajith to take the two bags to a priest and a musalyar while the third one is left with him. Later, the yogi asks him to stay in the house before the next full moon, 13 days from then as the spirit gets full powers on that day. The yogi gives them a raksha to be buried in front of the house.
Satyajith and his friends go to Chempakakotai.

In a flashback scene, Satyajith and his friends are shown to be fraudsters. After gathering lot of money, they go stay in Chempakakotai. There, Satyajith falls in love with a woman named Mathangi who has a daughter named Malli. Satyajith is seen to protect Mathangi and Malli from a man named Aadhishwaran who wants to marry Mathangi. Satyajith marries Mathangi. In the Chempakakotai, Mathangi waits for first night with Sathyajith. But, Aadhishwaran arrives instead, and reveals to Mathangi that he had a deal with Sathyajith. Aadhishwaran would help Satyajith to take away the fort in exchange for Mathangi. Aadhishwaran chases Mathangi, but she escapes away with Malli. Then Satyajith comes with his friends and locks the Chempakakotai doors and sets fire to Mathangi's house. For this, Sathyajith gets lot of money from a minister. That night, Sathyajith and his friends tries to celebrate but Sathyajith gets sad as he now feels that he shouldn't have cheated Mathangi. Next day, Sathyajith asks Aadhishwaran for Mathangi, who tells him that she ran away. Mathangi and Malli are shown to be trapped inside Chempakakotai without food and water. Malli dies from hunger. Later, Sathyajith comes to Chempakakkotai in search for Mathangi and finds Malli dead and darkened with Mathangi sitting close immobile. Sathyajith digs the grave, while this time Aadhishwaran comes and tells he will dig the grave as he only loved Mathangi but Sathyajith never loved Mathangi.

In present day, Sathyajith resides with his wife and daughter.  Meanwhile, the ghost kills one friend of Sathyajith in a car crash and explosion. 
Sathyajith and his family starts to live in Chempakakotai. His daughter gets possessed by Malli's ghost. The Yogi tells that only her mother Mathangi can calm Malli's ghost, and that Mathangi is still alive. Sathyajith and his wife goes to Aadhishwaran's house for Mathangi. A fight happens when Aadhishwaran doesn't want Mathangi to be taken away. Aadhishwaran tells Mathangi is tied up because she is mad. Sathyajith accuses Muthu for telling lies regarding Mathangi. Mathangi tells Satyajith that she acted mad and waited till this time in the hope of meeting Satyajith to ask why he cheated her and Malli. Mathangi finally agrees to come when Sathyajith's wife tells her that her child is innocent for the cheating from Sathyajith.

At Chempakakotai, upon seeing Mathangi, Malli tells she wants revenge as she was cheated. Now a Yaga with full swamy around start mantras. Mathangi takes the plate in which bone pieces of Malli is put, and puts it in fire. Mathangi dies there itself. Now Sathyajith is safe as his child now normal with his wife. Film end showing Mathangi and Malli spirit together ascend up to sky.

Cast

 Jayaram as Sathyajith
 Om Puri as Yogendra Muni
 Ramya Krishnan as Matangi (Mahishwari in Hindi version)
 Sheelu Abraham as Amala (Sathyajith's wife)
 Ramesh Pisharody as Sunny
 Saju Navodaya as Saju
 Akshara Kishor as Aami(Sathyajith and Amala's daughter)
 Aangelina Abraham as Malli (Mallika in Hindi version)
 Sampath Raj as Aadhishwaran
 Siddique as Psychiatrist/Narrator 
 S. P. Sreekumar as Appu
 Pradeep Kottayam as Kunju Narayanan (a journalist)
 Valsala Menon as a Black magician
 Thampy Antony as Father Arun Mouli
 Veena Nair as Jyothi (Appu's wife)
 Amritha Meera Vijayan as Chempakam

Production

The film is directed by Kannan Thamarakkulam which is a "horror comedy". Jayaram was selected in the leading role along with Om Puri and Ramya Krishnan in other pivotal roles. Jayaram used a salt and pepper hair style in the film which was suggested by his son Kalidas Jayaram. Sheelu Abraham is playing the female lead, the role which was initially offered and rejected by Jewel Mary, Sheila Kaur, and Asha Sarath.

The film's pooja ceremony was held in November 2015 at Thodupuzha, Kerala.

Music

The soundtrack and background score was composed by Ratheesh Vegha. The soundtrack comprising 4 tracks was released on 6 April 2016 by East Coast Audios. The release coincided with a promotional event held at the Adlux International Convention & Exhibition Centre in Angamaly, Kochi.

Release and reception
Aadupuliyattam released on 20 May 2016 in 70 centers across Kerala.

Box office
The film collected around  within 50days from Kerala box office.
The film was commercial success.

Post-release
Soon after the release, it was announced that a percentage of the film's gross profit will be shared with the family of 'Jisha', a Dalit girl from Perumbavoor who was brutally raped and killed in 2016.

References

External links
 
 

2016 films
2010s Malayalam-language films
Indian horror films
Films shot in Munnar
Films shot in Palani
Films directed by Kannan Thamarakkulam
2016 horror films